The 1987 London Marathon was the seventh running of the annual marathon race in London, United Kingdom, which took place on Sunday, 10 May. The elite men's race was won by Japan's Hiromi Taniguchi in a time of 2:09:50 hours and the women's race was won by Norway's Ingrid Kristiansen in 2:22:48. 

In the wheelchair races, British athletes Chris Hallam (2:08:34) and Karen Davidson (2:45:30) set course records in their wins of the men's and women's divisions, respectively. This was the first time that the winning time for the men's wheelchair race surpassed that of the able-bodied race.
 	 	
Around 80,000 people applied to enter the race, of which 28,364 had their applications accepted and 21,485 started the race. A total of 19,586 runners finished the race.

Results

Men

Women

Wheelchair men

Wheelchair women

References

Results
Results. Association of Road Racing Statisticians. Retrieved 2020-04-24.

External links

Official website

1987
London Marathon
Marathon
London Marathon